There are many traditional states in Nigeria. A partial list follows.
Although the traditional rulers no longer officially have political power, they still have considerable status in Nigeria and the power of patronage. 
Except where otherwise noted, names of traditional rulers are based on the World Statesmen.org list.

See also
Nigerian Chieftaincy
Nigerian traditional rulers

References

 
Traditional states of Nigeria
States
Traditional states